The 2022 Special Honours in New Zealand was a special honours list, dated 9 June 2002 and published in New Zealand on 14 June 2022. The actor, Sam Neill, was redesignated from Distinguished Companion to Knight Companion of the New Zealand Order of Merit. He had previously declined redesignation when titular honours were reintroduced by the New Zealand government in 2009.

New Zealand Order of Merit

Knight Companion (KNZM)
Redesignation
 Nigel John Dermot (Sam) Neill  – of Queenstown. Appointed a Distinguished Companion of the New Zealand Order of Merit on 30 December 2006.

References

Special honours
Special honours